Piliny is a village in Nógrád county, Hungary.

External links 
 Street map 

Populated places in Nógrád County